Renewable Electricity and the Grid: The Challenge of Variability is a 2007 book edited by Godfrey Boyle which examines the significance of the issue of variability of renewable energy supplies in the electricity grid.

Themes
The energy available from sun, wind, waves, and tides varies in ways which may not match variations in consumer energy demand. Assimilating these fluctuations can affect the operation and economics of electricity networks and markets. There are many myths and misunderstandings surrounding this topic. Renewable Electricity and the Grid presents technical and operational solutions to the problem of reconciling the differing patterns of power supply and demand.

Authors
Chapters of Renewable Electricity and the Grid are authored by leading experts, who explain and quantify the impacts of  renewable energy variability.  Godfrey Boyle (editor) is Director of the Energy and Environment Research Unit at the UK Open University and has written the textbooks Energy Systems and Sustainability (2003) and Renewable Energy: Power for a Sustainable Future (2004). He is a Fellow of the Institution of Engineering and Technology and a Trustee of the National Energy Foundation.

Other authors include:
Dr Bob Everett, open University,
Dr Mark Barret, Open University,
Dr Fred Starr, EU Energy Center at Petten
Dave Andrews, Wessex Water, Energy Manager
Brian Hurley - Airtricity

See also 

 List of books about energy issues
 100% renewable energy
 Greenhouse Solutions with Sustainable Energy
 Concentrated solar power
 Control of the National Grid
 Demand response
 Distributed generation
 Energy security and renewable technology
 Energy use and conservation in the United Kingdom
 Hybrid renewable energy system
 Load management
 National Grid Reserve Service
 Relative cost of electricity generated by different sources
 Renewable energy
 Solar energy
 Wind power

References

Energy policy
2007 non-fiction books
2007 in the environment
Electric power distribution
Renewable energy commercialization
Books about energy issues